is a Japanese footballer currently playing as a right-back for Tegevajaro Miyazaki.

Career statistics

Club
.

Notes

References

1996 births
Living people
Association football people from Fukuoka Prefecture
Fukuoka University alumni
Japanese footballers
Japan youth international footballers
Association football defenders
Japan Football League players
J3 League players
Tegevajaro Miyazaki players